Danish Crown may refer to several things.

 Danish krone, the currency used in Denmark
 The monarchy of Denmark
 Danish Crown Regalia, symbols of the Danish monarchy
 Danish Crown (company), a large meat processing company